Duck Creek Park and Golf Course is located on the east side of Davenport, Iowa, United States. The property was originally a private arboretum south of Duck Creek.  It was developed in the 1930s as a public works project during the Great Depression.  The  park features picnic shelters, tennis courts, playground, a public golf course and Duck Creek Lodge.  The Stampe Lilac Garden and Gazebo is a popular location for weddings.  The park connects with the Duck Creek Parkway.  

The golf course is an 18-hole, par 70 course. The course features mature trees and rolling hills. An automatic drainage system was installed in 1994.

See also
Emeis Park and Golf Course

References

Parks in Davenport, Iowa
Sports venues in the Quad Cities
Tourist attractions in the Quad Cities